In geometry, the paper bag problem or teabag problem is to calculate the maximum possible inflated volume of an initially flat sealed rectangular bag which has the same shape as a cushion or pillow, made out of two pieces of material which can bend but not stretch.

According to Anthony C. Robin, an approximate formula for the capacity of a sealed expanded bag is:

where w is the width of the bag (the shorter dimension), h is the height (the longer dimension), and V is the maximum volume. The approximation ignores the crimping round the equator of the bag.

A very rough approximation to the capacity of a bag that is open at one edge is:
 

(This latter formula assumes that the corners at the bottom of the bag are linked by a single edge, and that the base of the bag is not a more complex shape such as a lens).

The square teabag 

In the special case where the bag is sealed on all edges and is square with unit sides, h = w = 1, and so the first formula estimates a volume for this of roughly:

or roughly 0.19. According to Andrew Kepert at the University of Newcastle, Australia, an upper bound for this version of the teabag problem is 0.217+, and he has made a construction that appears to give a volume of 0.2055+.

In the article referred to above A C  Robin also found a more complicated formula for the general paper bag. Whilst this is beyond the scope of a general work, it is of interest to note that for the tea bag case this formula gives 0.2017, unfortunately not within the bounds given by Kepert (i.e., 0.2055+ ≤ maximum volume ≤ 0.217+).

See also 
 Biscornu, a shape formed by attaching two squares in a different way, with the corner of one at the midpoint of the other
 Mylar balloon (geometry)

References

External links 
 The original statement of the teabag problem
 Andrew Kepert's work on the teabag problem (mirror)
 Curved folds for the teabag problem
 A numerical approach to the teabag problem by Andreas Gammel
 

Geometric shapes
Mathematical optimization